Christian Markersen (17 September 1908 – 28 May 1982) was a Danish middle-distance runner. He competed in the men's 1500 metres at the 1932 Summer Olympics.

References

1908 births
1982 deaths
Athletes (track and field) at the 1932 Summer Olympics
Danish male middle-distance runners
Olympic athletes of Denmark
Place of birth missing
20th-century Danish people